Corrina Hewat (born 21 December 1970, Edinburgh) is a Scottish harpist and composer who was awarded Music Tutor of the Year at Na Trads in 2013. She has worked with poet Robin Robertson and has written music for the Dunedin Consort. She sings with Karine Polwart and Annie Grace in what they describe as a 'girly trio' and also appeared with Polwart on Lau's 2009 Arc Light album. She has collaborated with Patsy Reid (original founder of Breabach) and others as The Unusual Suspects. In July 2008 she performed with Bella Hardy at London's Royal Albert Hall as part of the first Folk Prom. In 2006 she appeared on Kathryn Tickell's The Sky Didn’t Fall album.

References

External links
Biography

Scottish folk harpists
1970 births
Living people